The tournament celebrated the fiftieth anniversary of Emperor Franz Joseph I of Austria's accession to the throne of Austria-Hungary. Main organiser was Baron Albert Freiherr von Rothschild who also financed the Vienna tournaments of 1873, 1882, 1903, and 1908. The players visited his Heugasse palace on 31 May 1898. Rounds were played in the clubhouse of the Wiener Schachklub at Schottengasse 7. Hugo Fahndrich was the tournament director at Kaiser Jubiläumsturnier 1898. The time limit was thirty moves in two hours, and fifteen moves per hour after this. Twenty great masters (only Emanuel Lasker and Rudolf Charousek were absent at Kaiser-Jubiläumsturnier) played double rounds from 1 June to 25 July. 

Adolf Schwarz withdrew after playing eight games.

Tarrasch and Pillsbury ended equal after two cycles and had to play an extra play-off match. The additional games were played from 27 until 30 July 1898.

Tarrasch won 6000 Kronen and Pillsbury won 4400 Kronen.

References

Literature
Hugo Fähndrich, Internationales Kaiser-Jubiläums-Schachturnier, 1981,  

Chess competitions
Chess in Austria
1898 in chess
1890s in Vienna
June 1898 sports events
July 1898 sports events
1898 in Austrian sport